The Karate1 Premier League is a Karate competition Initiated by the World Karate Federation in the year of 2011 with two tournaments held in Paris and Istanbul, the Karate1-Premier League- has made exponential progress in terms of magnitude and status of the tournaments as well as the number of participants and countries represented.

The Karate1-Premier League- is the most important league event in the world of Karate. It comprises a number of the most prominent Karate competitions and endeavours to bring together the best Karate athletes in the world in an open championships of unprecedented scale and quality.

Karate1 Premier League events is homogeneous system for qualification to the Olympic Karate tournament Started from 2018 at Berlin Germany Event and ended with 2021 Lisbon Portugal event for TOKYO 2020 Olympic Games Qualification Standing 

In 2022, a new round-robin format was introduced at the Karate1 Premier League.

Events

2011

2012

2013

2014

2015

2016

2017

2018

2019

2020

2021

Results

WKF Karate 1 Premier League 2021

See also

Comparison of karate styles

References

External links
 Karate 1 at  World Karate Federation

Karate competitions
Recurring sporting events established in 2011